, also known as Kazoku Game, is a Japanese television drama based on the award-winning novel of the same name by Yohei Honma, as well as an adaptation of its filmed version. The drama is directed by Yuichi Sato and Kazuyuki Iwata and was broadcast on Fuji TV. It aired from April 17 until June 19, 2013.

The drama was a critical and commercial success and received several awards.

Synopsis

Kazushige Numata (Itsuji Itao) and his wife Kayoko (Honami Suzuki) have two sons. The first son, Shinichi (Ryunosuke Kamiki),  studies well, but the second son, Shigeyuki (Seishuu Uragami), does not. Kazushige and Kayoko are worried about Shigeyuki, who might even fail to enter high school. To make matters worse, Shigeyuki stays at home and doesn't go to school.

Kazushige and his wife Kayoko find an advertisement for a private tutor on the internet. They contact and then meet Yoshimoto (Sho Sakurai), who becomes Shigeyuki's tutor. During their meeting, both parties lay out one condition to work with each other. The father stipulates that Shigeyuki must go back to school within a week or Yoshimoto will be fired. Meanwhile, Yoshimoto stipulates that the parents must not interfere with his work. Yoshimoto's extraordinary teaching methods then influence not only Shigeyuki, but also his entire family.

Cast

Sho Sakurai as Yoshimoto Koya / Tago Yuudai
Ryunosuke Kamiki as Numata Shinichi
Honami Suzuki as Numata Kayoko
Seishuu Uragami as Numata Shigeyuki
Itsuji Itao as Numata Kazushige
Shioli Kutsuna as Asami Maika / Tachibana Maki

Ratings

In the table below,  represents the lowest ratings and  represents the highest ratings.

Reception

The drama received positive reviews from critics. Philip Brasor from Japan Times compared the drama to the film adaptation. He said that "it exaggerates the elements that made the movie (The Family Game 2013) shocking. The characters aren’t just deluded, they’re twisted." Brasor particularly praised Sho Sakurai's portrayal of Yoshimoto, in which he said that "[Yūsaku] Matsuda’s tutor was an antisocial loser with a streak of cruelty. Sakurai’s is a full-blown sociopath. Matsuda struck Shigeyuki just to get a rise out of him. Sakurai not only strikes Shigeyuki (Seishuu Uragami), he practically destroys the Numata home on a weekly basis, cackling all the while like the Wicked Witch of the West. Matsuda’s power over the Numata household came from the force of his personality. Sakurai’s power is of the purely calculating kind, as is the writing in general....Like Matsuda’s tutor, Sakurai uses gamesmanship instead of pedagogy to get results, but his methodology is more sadistic."

Sho Sakurai's acting reportedly made fans find it "too disturbing to watch". It was dubbed as 2013's Biggest Drama Surprise by critics, and Sakurai was given a number of awards.

Awards and nominations

References

External links
 

2013 Japanese television series debuts
2013 Japanese television series endings